Agyemang is a surname. Notable people with the surname include:

 Albert Agyemang (born 1977), Ghanaian sprinter
 Louis Agyemang (born 1983), Ghanaian footballer
 Patrick Agyemang (born 1980), English footballer

See also
 Emmanuel Agyemang-Badu (born 1990), Ghanaian footballer
 Agyeman

Surnames of Akan origin